The Execution Act 1664 (16 & 17 Car 2 c 5) was an Act of the Parliament of England.

The whole Act was repealed by section 34(1) of, and Schedule 2 to, the Administration of Justice Act 1965.

References
Halsbury's Statutes,

Acts of the Parliament of England
1664 in law
1664 in England